Linda Anne Chapman (born 15 January 1969 in Liverpool) is a British writer, principally of series for younger children. She is particularly known for her fantasy books about unicorns, mermaids and magic and has co-authored books with Julie Sykes (Unicorn Academy, Mermaid Academy and Forever Homes), Michelle Misra, Lee Weatherly and Steve Cole. She also writes the Superpowers series as Alex Cliff (her own pseudonym). She has written several of the series books published under the names Lucy Daniels, Jenny Dale, Daisy Meadows (Rainbow Magic), Rosie Banks (Secret Kingdom and Secret Princesses) Katie Chase (Little Princesses), Amber Castle (Spell Sisters), Astrid Foss (Snow Sisters), Tilda Kelly, Posy Diamond and Lauren Brooke, either as part of a collective pseudonym or as a ghostwriter. She has written "about 290" books. She currently lives in a Leicestershire village with her husband and three children.

The Superpowers series features boys and "I wrote it under the name Alex Cliff in case the name Linda Chapman put any boys off."

Novels
 Bright Lights (2003)
 Centre Stage (2004) – sequel to Bright Lights 
 Genie Us (with Steve Cole) (2009)
 Genie and the Phoenix (with Steve Cole) (2010)

Series
 My Secret Unicorn
 Stardust 
 Not Quite a Mermaid
 Unicorn School
 Genie Us (with Steve Cole)
 Sky Horses
 Skating School
 Loving Spirit
 Sophie and the Shadow Woods (with Lee Weatherly)
 Mr Monkey
 Best Friends Bakery
 Star Friends
 Mermaids Rock
 Moonlight Riders
 Magic Keepers
 A Pony Called Angel
 Hello Kitty's Friendship Club (with Michelle Misra)
 Wild Friends (with Michelle Misra)
 Dinosaur Land (with Michelle Misra)
 Angel Wings (with Michelle Misra)
 Unicorn Academy (with Julie Sykes)
 Mermaid Academy (with Julie Sykes)
 Forever Homes (with Julie Sykes)

As Alex Cliff
 Superpowers

As Daisy Meadows
(with Sue Bentley, Narinder Dhami, and Sue Mongredien)

 Rainbow Magic

As Lauren Brooke
 Heartland (novel series)

As Jenny Dale
 Pony Tales

As Lucy Daniels
 Animal Ark
 Animal Ark Pets
 Little Animal Ark
 The Horseshoe Trilogies

As Amber Castle
 Spell Sisters

As Rosie Banks
 Secret Kingdom
 Secret Princesses

As Astrid Foss
 Snow Sisters

As Posy Diamond
 Bridesmaids Club

References

External links
 
Linda Chapman's Circle of Secrets and Magic
 
  under her real name – with linked pseudonym Amber Castle and several joint pseudonyms

1969 births
Living people
British children's writers
Writers from Liverpool